Stéfanie Schmid (born 24 October 1968) is a Swiss former competitive figure skater in ladies' singles. She is the 1986 Karl Schäfer Memorial silver medalist, the 1987 Winter Universiade silver medalist, and a two-time Swiss national champion (1988 and 1989). In February 1988, she represented Switzerland at the  Olympic Winter Games in Calgary, Canada; she ranked 21st in compulsory figures, 16th in the short program, 12th in the free skate, and 15th overall. She was a member of CP Genève.

Competitive highlights

References

Swiss female single skaters
1968 births
Olympic figure skaters of Switzerland
Figure skaters at the 1988 Winter Olympics
Universiade medalists in figure skating
Living people
Universiade silver medalists for Switzerland
Competitors at the 1987 Winter Universiade